Watson N. "Waddy" Spoelstra (April 5, 1910 – July 20, 1999) was an American sportswriter for The Detroit News from 1945 to 1973. He served as the president of the Baseball Writers' Association of America in 1968.  After retiring from The Detroit News, he founded Baseball Chapel, a Christian ministry for professional baseball players, which he led from 1973 to 1982.

Spoelstra was born in Grand Rapids, Michigan in 1910.  He attended Hope College where he played baseball and basketball.  He became Hope College's all-time leading scorer in basketball.  He graduated from Hope College in 1932.

After graduating from college, Spoelstra was hired as a sportswriter by the Associated Press, assigned to Detroit.  In approximately 1945, Spoelstra was hired by The Detroit News, where he remained for nearly 30 years.

His son Jon Spoelstra is a former National Basketball Association executive and his grandson Erik Spoelstra is the current head coach of the Miami Heat.

Selected articles by Spoelstra
Penn Victory Would Be Heart-Rending for Wolverines, October 25, 1940
Harmon Within One Touchdown of Red Grange's Record (Tom Harmon), November 17, 1940
Joe Louis Trains for Simon Bout in Down-Town Ballroom (Joe Louis), March 13, 1941
Texas Star Replaces Gehringer (Dutch Meyer), July 17, 1941
Tigers Rookie Star Seeking First Win (Floyd Giebell), July 19, 1941
Yost Suspects Michigan May Get Back Jug (Little Brown Jug), October 21, 1941
Dorais Has Ace Passer in Soph (Gus Dorais/"Tippy" Madarik), November 10, 1941
Gehringer Nearing End of Playing Days (Charlie Gehringer), November 18, 1941
Wartime Sports Program Slated, December 29, 1941
Kuzma Seen as Key to Michigan Success (Tom Kuzma), September 24, 1942
Tigers Name O'Neill To Succeed Baker as Pilot (Steve O'Neill), November 29, 1942
Dorais to Coach Detroit Lions (Gus Dorais), January 10, 1943
Jake LaMotta Rations Sugar (Jake LaMotta), February 6, 1943
Detroit Tigers Expect To Be Strong Contender (1943 Detroit Tigers), February 8, 1943
Call Overmire Another Kerr (Stubby Overmire), June 9, 1943
 Ford Industrial Empire Boasts Sports Notables (Harry Bennett), July 12, 1943
War Worker Is Hockey Flash (Syd Howe), February 4, 1944
He Can Still Run! (Jesse Owens), March 8, 1944
Michigan, Detroit Bid For Westfall: Big Back Is Out of Army (Bob Westfall), May 21, 1944
One-Two Gives Zip To Tigers) (Hal Newhouser/Dizzy Trout), June 1, 1944
Stay-at-Home 'Ivory Hunter' Bags Big Prizes for Tigers (Wish Egan), July 8, 1944
It's Open Season for Trout as Talker (Dizzy Trout), The Sporting News, January 3, 1946
Hank Whacks Tiger Pitch for $60,000: Greenberg Signs Contract Without Any Fuss in Press (Hank Greenberg), February 21, 1946, page 3
$100 Gold Rings Given to Members of '45 Club, The Sporting News, June 26, 1946
"Clouter Kell Rings Bell With Detroit's Fandom", The Sporting News, August 14, 1946, page 7
Here's How to Break in Your Glove, Baseball Digest, July 1947
"Those Drives to Left Surprise Ted, Too" (Ted Williams), The Sporting News, June 30, 1948, page 3
"Rolfe Pledges 'Hard Work' by Tigers" (Red Rolfe), The Sporting News, November 24, 1948, page 3
Michigan Sets Sights on Third Title in Row (1949 Michigan Wolverines football team), September 17, 1949
"Kuzava Says Snider's Pop-Up Decided Classic" (Bob Kuzava), The Sporting News, January 7, 1953, page 3
"Keen Play of Kuenn Tigers' Top '53 Tale" (Harvey Kuenn), The Sporting News, September 16, 1953, page 6
"McHale Served Six Years as Farm Aide" (John McHale), The Sporting News'', November 11, 1953, page 2
'Hardest loser' Martin made the difference (Billy Martin/1972 Detroit Tigers), October 6, 1972

References

1910 births
1999 deaths
Baseball writers
The Detroit News people
Sportswriters from Michigan
20th-century American non-fiction writers
20th-century American businesspeople
Writers from Grand Rapids, Michigan
Hope College alumni